Cyrtodactylus punctatus is a species of gecko endemic to Sri Lanka.

References

Cyrtodactylus
Reptiles described in 1867
Taxa named by John Edward Gray
Reptiles of Sri Lanka
Endemic fauna of Sri Lanka